The 1952 season was FC Steaua București's 5th season since its founding in 1947.

Friendly matches

Divizia A

League table

Results

Source:

Cupa României

Results

See also

 1952 Cupa României
 1952 Divizia A

Notes and references

External links
 1952 FC Steaua București matches

FC Steaua București seasons
1951–52 in Romanian football
1952–53 in Romanian football
Steaua, București
Steaua, București
Steaua
Steaua
Romanian football championship-winning seasons